Ricardo Morán (25 May 1941 – 3 June 2015) was an Argentine actor from Buenos Aires.

Selected filmography
La Colimba no es la guerra (1972)
Mi amigo Luis (1972)
Mi hijo Ceferino Namuncurá (1972)
Hoy le toca a mi mujer (1973)
Juegos de verano (1973)
Crimen en el hotel alojamiento (1974)
Operación rosa rosa (1974)
Yo tengo fe (1974)
No hay que aflojarle a la vida (1975)
Brigada en acción (1977)
Expertos en Pinchazos (1979)
Locos por la música (1980)
Television
Los Simuladores
Married... with Children (Spanish version)

References

External links

1941 births
2015 deaths
Argentine male television actors
Argentine male film actors
Male actors from Buenos Aires
Argentine male stage actors
20th-century Argentine male actors